Inside is a puzzle-platform game developed and published by Playdead in 2016, and was released on June 29, for Xbox One, Windows, on July 7, and August 23, for PlayStation 4. The game was released for iOS in December 2017 and Nintendo Switch in June 2018. A macOS version was released in June 2020. The player controls a boy in a dystopic world, solving environmental puzzles and avoiding death. It is the successor to Playdead's 2010 Limbo, with similar 2.5D gameplay.

Playdead began work on Inside shortly after the release of Limbo, using Limbos custom game engine. The team switched to Unity to simplify development, adding their own rendering routines, later released as open source, to create a signature look. The game was partially funded by a grant from the Danish Film Institute. Inside premiered at Microsoft's E3 2014 conference, with a planned release in 2015, but was delayed to 2016.

Inside was released to critical acclaim. Critics noted it as an improvement over Limbo, praising its art direction, atmosphere and gameplay. The game was nominated for numerous accolades, including game of the year, and won several independent and technical achievements. As with Limbo, Inside is included on multiple lists of the greatest video games of all time as compiled by game journalists.

Gameplay 
Inside is a puzzle platformer. The player character is an unnamed boy who explores a surreal and mostly monochromatic environment presented as a 2.5D platform game. The game is dark, with color used sparingly to highlight both the player and certain parts of the environment. The game is mostly silent, with the exception of occasional musical cues, the boy's vocals, dogs barking, equipment and sound effects. The player controls the boy who walks, runs, swims, climbs, and uses objects to overcome obstacles and progress in the game. The boy gains the ability to control bodies to complete certain puzzles, a mechanic that IGN Marty Sliva compared to a similar mechanic in The Swapper. At various points in the game, the player may discover hidden rooms containing glowing orbs. If all the orbs are deactivated during a playthrough, the player unlocks the game's alternate ending.

The boy can die in a multitude of ways, including drowning, being shot with a gun or tranquilizer dart, mauled by dogs, ensnared by security machines, being blown apart by shockwaves, and others. As in the predecessor game Limbo, these deaths are presented realistically and are often graphic, but to a larger degree, earning the ESRB's Mature rating as opposed to Limbo Teen rating. If the character dies, the game continues from the most recent checkpoint.

Plot 
A boy slides down a rocky incline. While running through a forest, he encounters masked guards with flashlights, as well as vehicles with mounted spotlights, and fierce guard dogs. He escapes the guards, then crosses a road where a block has been set up with more vehicles and guards, to a farm where parasitic worms cause pigs to run rampant. The boy uses the farm animals and equipment to escape to a seemingly abandoned city where lines of zombie-like people are moved through mind control. Beyond the city is a large factory of flooded rooms, a shock wave atrium, and a laboratory environment where scientists perform underwater experiments on bodies.

While traversing these areas, the boy uses a mind-control helmet to control some of the zombies he encounters. The boy comes across an underwater siren-like creature that attaches a device to him, allowing him to breathe underwater.

Continuing through the office and laboratories, the boy sees scientists observing a large spherical chamber. The boy enters the chamber and discovers the Huddle, a monstrous mass of conjoined human bodies. After disconnecting the Huddle's restraints the boy is pulled into it.

The Huddle escapes confinement, crashing through offices, killing some of the scientists in its path. The scientists trap the Huddle in another tank, but the Huddle escapes again and breaks through a wooden wall. It rolls down a forest hill and comes to a stop at a grassy coastline bathed in light.

Alternate ending 
If the player deactivated the hidden light orbs in the various bunkers, the boy returns to one of the bunkers and gains access to a new area. He reaches an area that includes a bank of computers and one of the mind-control helmets, powered by a nearby socket. The boy pulls the plug from the socket, upon which the character takes the same stance as the zombies.

Theories 
Journalists and players have offered several different theories about the game's main ending (the freeing of the Huddle) and the alternative ending.

One theory speculates that the boy is controlled by the Huddle throughout most of the game, leading him to help free the Huddle from containment. As described by Jeffrey Matulef of Eurogamer, the game impresses that the Huddle has a magnetic-like draw that leads the boy to endanger himself and unquestioningly enter the tank where the Huddle is kept so as to free it. Players speculated on the theory that taking the alternate ending is working contrary to the Huddle's goal, and the act of unplugging the computers is to release the Huddle's control on the boy. There are some who believe that in the world of Inside, humanity has almost been destroyed because of some ultimate biological catastrophe and that the scientists are making experiments with the Huddle so it can control minds very far away to free itself. This has been thought because there are large quantities of buildings under water. When the Huddle escapes, there is a 3D work of paper and wood that represents the coasts at which the Huddle arrives after escaping the tank of water. A similar theory has the boy being controlled by one or more of the scientists, evidenced by how some of the scientists appear to aid the Huddle in escaping the facility. In this theory, the scientists put the boy through many dangers to gain strength and intelligence, so that these qualities can be absorbed by the Huddle when the boy frees it, improving the creature in a desirable manner for these scientists.

A more metafictional interpretation of the game from its alternate ending is based on the notion of player agency. Matulef summarizes this theory as "the boy is being controlled by a renegade force represented by the player". The act of pulling the plug in the final area is similar to the concept of The Matrix, as described by PC Gamers Tim Clark. Matulef explains that the location of the alternate ending is only known to the player with knowledge of the main ending and not to the Huddle or the scientists. With knowledge of the game's true ending, achieving the alternate ending is to reach a conclusion to the game that "ostensibly puts an end to the boy, the blob, and any inhumane experiments being conducted".

Development 
Playdead released the monochromatic Limbo in July 2010, which was critically praised and sold over one million units. Within a few months of its release, Playdead began development on their second game under the working title "Project 2". As a spiritual successor to Limbo, Inside reclaimed assets from Limbo development. Playdead said that the two games were similar, though Inside is more "crazy", "weird", and 3D. The Danish Film Institute provided one million dollars in funding towards the game.

While Playdead had built a custom game engine for Limbo, they chose Unity to reduce their workload. The developers created a temporal anti-aliasing filter for the engine, entitled "temporal reprojection", to create a signature look for Inside. In March 2016, Playdead released the source code under an open source license.

The Huddle, the amalgam of body parts that the player controls at the end of the game, had been an idea for the game since 2010, when animator Andreas Normand Grøntved had been brought aboard Playdead to do preliminary animations for it based on a drawing by artist Morten Bramsen. Bramsen's drawing of the Huddle served to guide much of the visual nature and art style for the rest of the game. To animate it, Grøntved took inspiration from the motion of Nago the demon form of the boar god from Princess Mononoke, the squishiness of the main character of the game Gish, and human behavior during crowd surfing. Grøntved developed initial animations using what he called the Huddle Potato that simplified the geometries to demonstrate how the being would move and interact with the environment. Whereas most of the other game animations were based on a combination of pre-set skeletal movements along with the physics engine, the Huddle had to be animated predominantly by a custom physics model developed by Thomas Krog, and implemented by Lasse Jon Fulgsang Pedersen, Søren Trautner Madsen, and Mikkel Bøgeskov Svendsen. This model uses a 26-body simulation of the core of the Huddle, driven by a network of impulses based on the direction of the player and the local environment, which allowed the Huddle to reconfigure itself as it needed in certain situations, such as fitting into tight spaces. They then added six arms and six legs with some pre-set animations that would also help to drive the impulse in the main body simulation. The skin of the huddle was a mix of art styles borrowed from the sculptures of John Isaacs, and the art of Jenny Saville and Rembrandt. The vocals and bodysounds were performed by the renowned Danish-Austrian performance group SIGNA.

Microsoft announced Inside during its E3 2014 press conference. Prior to this, the game had been planned for release on non-Microsoft platforms, including the PlayStation 3 and OS X. Playdead had purposely waited four years so as to give little time between the announce event and the launch. IGNs Ryan McCaffrey wrote that the announcement was a sign of Microsoft's commitment to indie game development and said it was his biggest surprise of the year. The developer later delayed the game from its expected early 2015 release for further refinement of the game, but provided no expected launch window. A playable demo was prepared for an August 2015 Microsoft event before PAX Prime. With the delay, Playdead only planned for initial release on Windows and Xbox One, but had expressed interest in other consoles in the future.

Playdead announced Inside release dates during E3 2016, and as a limited-time promotion, let players download Limbo for free in advance of the title's release. Inside was released for Xbox One on 29 June 2016, and for Windows via Steam on 7 July. Ports for other platforms followed: the PlayStation 4 version was released on 23 August, the iOS version on December 15, 2017, and the Nintendo Switch version on June 28, 2018 alongside the release of Limbo. 505 Games published Inside and Limbo as a dual-game retail package for Xbox One and PlayStation 4, which was released in September 2017.

Playdead partnered with iam8bit and Abyss Creations (the manufacturers of RealDoll) to create a special release edition of the game for the PlayStation 4 which includes a silicone recreation of the Huddle, along with additional art. Though revealed and sold in 2018, the contents of the special edition were not fully revealed until December 2019.

Music 
Martin Stig Andersen, with SØS Gunver Ryberg, composed and designed Insides soundtrack, returning from Limbo. Andersen was inspired by 1980s B horror films, often using synthesizers, but did not want to compose an actual soundtrack. Instead, he created the music by routing sound through a human skull and recording the result, a "bone-conducting sound" that created a "sombre, chill quality" that often complements Insides visuals. 

Inside has a close integration of the game-play and audio, with some puzzles set directly to visual-aural cues. This required Andersen to work more closely with the game-play developers than he had in Limbo. This enabled additional visual elements tied to the audio; Andersen noted that the boy's chest movements related to breathing are tied to the sound effects he created for his breathing, which themselves are influenced by where the character is in the game, with differences being calm and panicked emotions depending on location. Andersen collaborated with the design team on the game's general structure and pacing to provide scenes where the music builds up atmospheric tension.

Reception 

Inside received universal acclaim, according to video game review aggregator Metacritic. Critics favorably compared the title as a worthy successor to Limbo. The game was one of Polygon and IGN most anticipated 2016 releases. From previewing the game at E3 2016, IGN Marty Sliva considered the title to be "Super Limbo", polishing and improving from Playdead's first game into the new title in the same manner that Nintendo had done for its previous games in bringing them to the Super Nintendo Entertainment System. Kirk Hamilton of Kotaku called the game an "evolution" on what Playdead has succeeded to do with Limbo. Jaz Rignall of USgamer previewed Inside and wrote that it was one of the best puzzle platformers he has played, even better than its predecessor.

Much like for Limbo, several publications have included Inside on their lists of the greatest video games of all time. In 2022, PC Gamer listed Inside as one of the best PC games, with editor Rich Stanton stating the game was "one of the very best experiences I've had in gaming", and contributing writers stating the game was "the perfect narrative sidescroller", and "had one of the best endings of any game".

Accolades
The game won the awards for "Golden Cube" and "Best Desktop/Console Game" at the Unity Awards 2016, and it also won the award for "Best-Looking Game" at the Giant Bomb 2016 Game of the Year Awards, whereas its other nomination was for "Best Moment or Sequence". At The Edge Awards 2016, the game came in second place each for "Best Visual Design", "Best Storytelling" and "Studio of the Year", and it came in third place for "Game of the Year", while it won the award for "Best Audio Design".

References

External links 
 

Video games with 2.5D graphics
2016 video games
Art games
Dystopian video games
Indie video games
IOS games
Monochrome video games
Nintendo Switch games
PlayStation 4 games
Puzzle-platform games
Side-scrolling platform games
Single-player video games
Video games developed in Denmark
Windows games
Xbox One games
Video games with alternate endings
Cinematic platform games
Apple Design Awards recipients
British Academy Games Award for Game Design winners
The Game Awards winners
Interactive Achievement Award winners
Game Developers Choice Award winners
Webby Award winners